Coolibah Station is a pastoral lease that operates as a cattle station in the Northern Territory of Australia.

The  property running 80,000 head of cattle is owned by Milton Jones. Jones, who owns a helicopter business specializes in aerial mustering, bought the property in 1988 with cash. The station is best known for being the location of the reality television program Keeping up with the Joneses.

The property was acquired by Patrick Quilty, the son of Tom Quilty, in 1938. Quilty Snr. owned Glenore Station and Euroka Springs Station, both of which were passed onto his sons. Prior to his death in 1938 Patrick Quilty and his brother Tom acquired Bradshaw Station, Coolibah Station and Bedford Downs Station.

A Dragon Rapide aeroplane, of Connellan Airways, crashed at Coolibah in 1949. The head stockman, an Aboriginal man named Jack Brumby, was recommended for a gallantry award for rescuing the pilot.

The manager of the day, Hugh Byers, was committed to stand trial for the theft of 88 head of cattle from neighbouring Victoria River Downs Station.

In the same year filming of the Charles Chauvel movie, Jedda, was commenced at Coolibah.

See also
List of ranches and stations

References

Stations (Australian agriculture)
Pastoral leases in the Northern Territory